Vasconcellea monoica (commonly known as col de montaña, col de monte, or peladera in Spanish) is a species of flowering plant in the family Caricaceae. It is native to Bolivia, Ecuador, and Peru. The plant has a chromosome count of 2n = 18.

It was previously placed in genus Carica.

Gallery

References

External links

monoica